St. Malachy's Church may refer to:

 Saint Malachy's Church, Belfast, a Catholic Church in Northern Ireland
 Saint Malachy's Roman Catholic Church, in Manhattan, United States